Buddhism in Maharashtra may refer to:

 Marathi Buddhists
 Navayana